Morris Marshall Kirksey (September 13, 1895 – November 25, 1981) was an American track and field athlete and rugby union footballer who won two gold medals at the 1920 Summer Olympics. He is one of four athletes to win gold medals in two different Olympic sports.

Biography
Born in Waxahachie, Texas, Kirksey moved to the San Francisco Bay Area when he was about thirteen years old and graduated from Palo Alto High School in 1913.

At the 1920 Olympic Games in Antwerp, Kirksey finished second in the 100-meter sprint behind Charley Paddock. Six days later, he anchored the United States 4x100-meter relay team that won the gold medal in a world record time of 42.2 seconds. Two weeks later, Kirksey won his second gold medal, helping the American rugby team defeat France 8–0.

Kirksey earned a bachelor's degree in philosophy from Stanford and then a degree from St. Louis Medical College. He worked as a staff psychiatrist for the state Department of Corrections, assigned to San Quentin and Folsom prisons.

Morris Kirksey died in San Mateo, California, at the age of 86.

References

External links
 

1895 births
1981 deaths
American male sprinters
American rugby union players
Athletes (track and field) at the 1920 Summer Olympics
Rugby union players at the 1920 Summer Olympics
Olympic rugby union players of the United States
Olympic gold medalists for the United States in track and field
Olympic silver medalists for the United States in track and field
People from Waxahachie, Texas
Stanford Cardinal men's track and field athletes
United States international rugby union players
Track and field athletes from California
Medalists at the 1920 Summer Olympics
Washington University School of Medicine alumni